Arnside Knott is a hill with a summit elevation of , near Arnside, Cumbria, England. Although it is in South Lakeland district it is not in the Lake District National Park, lying south of the River Kent which forms the south eastern boundary of the national park. It is within the Arnside and Silverdale Area of Outstanding Natural Beauty, and is National Trust property.

Arnside Knott is the lowest Marilyn (i.e. a hill with at least 150 m of topographic prominence) in England. It was not included in Alan Dawson's The Relative Hills of Britain (1992)  which was the first listing of Marilyns, but was added to the list in 2004–05.

The National Trust grazes Highland cattle on Arnside Knott.

On the north slopes of the meadow the now defunct Arnside Golf Club had a golf green from 1906 to the time of World War 2.

References

External links

Marilyns of England
Mountains and hills of Cumbria
National Trust properties in Cumbria
Arnside